The 1927 Fresno State Bulldogs football team represented Fresno State Normal School—now known as California State University, Fresno—during the 1927 college football season.

Fresno State competed in the Far Western Conference (FWC). The 1927 team was led by head coach Arthur W. Jones in his seventh year at the helm. They played home games at Fresno State College Stadium on the campus of Fresno City College in Fresno, California. They finished with a record of three wins, three losses and two ties (3–3–2, 2–1–1 FWC). The Bulldogs were outscored by their opponents 45–79 for the season.

Schedule

Notes

References

Fresno State
Fresno State Bulldogs football seasons
Fresno State Bulldogs football